SIMP J013656.5+093347 (abbreviated SIMP0136) is a brown dwarf or planetary mass object at 19.9 light-years from Earth in the constellation Pisces. It belongs to the spectral class T2.5 and its position shifts due to its proper motion annually by about 1.24 arcsec in the right ascension.

This brown dwarf provided the first evidence for periodic variability flux variations among T dwarfs. This has been interpreted as a signature of weather patterns coming in and out of view over the object's 2.4h rotation period. The shape of this lightcurve evolves over timescales of days, which has been interpreted as a sign of evolution of the cloud patterns in its atmosphere.

In 2017, it was announced that the object's mass may be as low as 12.7 Jupiter masses and might be considered a rogue planet rather than a brown dwarf as it seems to be a member of the relatively young, 200 million-year-old Carina-Near stellar moving group.

In 2018, astronomers noted, "Detecting SIMP J01365663+0933473 with the VLA through its auroral radio emission, also means that we may have a new way of detecting exoplanets, including the elusive rogue ones not orbiting a parent star ... This particular object is exciting because studying its magnetic dynamo mechanisms can give us new insights on how the same type of mechanisms can operate in extrasolar planets - planets beyond our Solar System ... We think these mechanisms can work not only in brown dwarfs, but also in both gas giant and terrestrial planets." During the observation with the VLA only one pulse was detected for SIMP0136.The magnetic flux of SIMP0136 was estimated to be 3.2 kG.

References

Brown dwarfs
Rogue planets
Pisces (constellation)
T-type stars